The Acta de Tejeros was a document prepared on March 23, 1897 which proclaimed the events at the Tejeros Convention on March 22 to have been "disorderly and tarnished by chicanery." Signatories to this petition rejected the insurgent government instituted at the convention and affirmed their steadfast devotion to the ideals of the Katipunan. This and the later Naic Military Agreement repudiating the Tejeros Convention results would later cost Andres Bonifacio his life. He would be tried for treason at Maragondon, Cavite on May 10, 1897 and sentenced to death.

English translation

Note: Signatures in the above where spelling is uncertain are indicated by [?].

References

1897 in the Philippines
History of Cavite
Philippine Revolution
March 1897 events